Leptinotarsa peninsularis is a species of leaf beetle in the family Chrysomelidae. It is found in Central America and North America.

References

Further reading

 
 
 
 
 
 

Chrysomelinae
Beetles described in 1894